Dixona is a historic house in Smith County, Tennessee, near Dixon Springs. It is one of the oldest homes in Middle Tennessee.

The house was built in 1787–88 by Tilman Dixon, the Revolutionary War soldier who was Dixon Springs' first settler and namesake. His land holdings, received as a Revolutionary War land grant, totaled . In 1797, Louis Philippe, then Duke of Orleans and later King of France, stayed in Dixona together with his brothers, the Duke of Montpensier and Count of Beaujolais, during their travels in America. The house was Smith County's first tavern and post office; in 1799 it was used as the site for the county's first county court meeting.

The original house was an eight-room log building. The original log structure still forms the core of the house.

Dixona was listed on the National Register of Historic Places in 1973. Since 2007, Dixona Farm, the  tract on which Dixona is located, has been protected by a conservation easement held by the Land Trust for Tennessee.

See also
List of the oldest buildings in Tennessee

References

External links
 Major Tilman Dixon, Patriot, Soldier, Explorer, and Pioneer (Scott K. Williams, 1998)
 North Carolina Warrant 46 to Tilman Dixon for 3,840 Acres

Houses in Smith County, Tennessee
Houses completed in 1788
Houses on the National Register of Historic Places in Tennessee
1788 establishments in North Carolina
National Register of Historic Places in Smith County, Tennessee